Ip is a commune in Sălaj County, Crișana, Romania. It is composed of five villages: Cosniciu de Jos (Alsókaznacs), Cosniciu de Sus (Felsőkaznacs), Ip, Zăuan (Szilágyzovány) and Zăuan-Băi (Zoványfürdő).

The commune was the initial site of the events that led to the Ip massacre in 1940.

Sights 
 Reformed Church in Ip, built in the 16th century, historic monument

References

Communes in Sălaj County
Localities in Crișana